Museum of Cultural History may refer to:

 Fowler Museum at UCLA, in Los Angeles, California
 Museum of Cultural History, Oslo, Norway
 Museum of Cultural History, Rostock, Mecklenburg-Vorpommern, Germany